The discography of Neutral Milk Hotel, a Ruston, Louisiana-based indie rock group, consists of two studio albums, two singles, two extended plays, two compilation albums, and three demos.

Neutral Milk Hotel formed in 1989 as an offshoot of Milk, a high school musical project of singer-songwriter Jeff Mangum, and the band was largely a Mangum solo project in the group's earlier days. The group was a part of The Elephant 6 Recording Company, a collective of musicians that includes, among others, notable indie rock bands The Apples in Stereo, The Olivia Tremor Control, and Of Montreal. The 1993 single "Everything Is" was the band's first release, and it would later be reissued as an EP with additional tracks. The band's first studio album, On Avery Island, was released on the independent label Merge, and has sold a relatively high 5,000 copies. Afterwards, the band began to tour for the first time, and grew to include horns player Scott Spillane, multi-instrumentalist Julian Koster, and drummer Jeremy Barnes. In 1998 the band released In the Aeroplane Over the Sea on Merge, an album which has since become one of the most popular and acclaimed indie rock albums of the 1990s. Up until 2011's Ferris Wheel on Fire EP, the band had no new releases since In the Aeroplane Over the Sea, though Mangum has said "I don't know what's going to happen, but I certainly want to make music a bigger part of my life in the future than it has been for the last couple of years."

Albums

Studio albums

Compilation albums

Extended plays

Singles

Demos

Miscellaneous

Unreleased songs
There are several songs which have been written and performed by Neutral Milk Hotel but have not officially released. These include songs that have only been performed live and songs that have appeared on unreleased demo tapes. Mangum stated that he has written songs possibly intended for a future Neutral Milk Hotel release, although these songs went unnamed; the only known song written after In the Aeroplane over the Sea is "Little Birds". The following are titled unreleased songs by Neutral Milk Hotel.

 "Sweet Marie"
 "Love You More Than Life"
 "Candy Coated Dream"
 "Through My Tears"
 "I Hear You Breathe"
 "Random Noise II"
 "Random Noise III"
 "Jennifer"

 "All the Colors of the Rainbow"
 "She Did A Lot of Acid/Beautiful Baby"
 "Worms In The Wind"
 "Goldaline"
 "Now There is Nothing"

 I  From the first untitled demo tape. "Candy Coated Dream" has since been released as "Unborn" on the 2011 re-release of "Everything Is".
 II  From the second untitled demo tape.
 III  Although never released in full, the last verse of "Oh Comely" is taken from "Goldaline".

See also
 The Apples in Stereo discography
 Live at Jittery Joe's
 Orange Twin Field Works: Volume I

References

General
 "Neutral Milk Hotel: Recordings". neutralmilkhotel.net. Retrieved on August 26, 2007.
 "Neutral Milk Hotel discography". Merge Records. Retrieved on August 26, 2007.
 Bachner, Gavin. "Neutral Milk Hotel releases". neutralmilkhotel.org. Retrieved on September 2, 2007.
 Cooper, Kim (2005). In the Aeroplane over the Sea 33⅓. (New York) Continuum International Publishing Group. .
 DeRogatis, Jim (2003). Turn On Your Mind: Four Decades of Great Psychedelic Rock. (Milwaukee) Hal Leonard Corporation. .
Specific

External links
 Neutral Milk Hotel's official site
 Neutral Milk Hotel at Elephant 6
 Neutral Milk Hotel at Merge Records
 

Discographies of American artists
Rock music group discographies